"Four Notes - Paul's Tune" is a song performed by Paul Harvey and the BBC Philharmonic. The song was released as a digital download on 22 October 2020. Proceeds from the song were split between the Alzheimer's Society and Music for Dementia. The song peaked at number thirty-two on the UK Singles Chart, and number one on the UK Singles Download Chart.

Background
Paul Harvey went viral in September 2020, when son Nick posted a video online of an "old party trick" where Paul (a former music teacher living with dementia) composed a song from just four notes. It was picked up by BBC Radio 4's Broadcasting House for World Alzheimer's Day; The show's host later arranged for the BBC Philharmonic Orchestra to record the song.

Chart performance
On 2 November 2020, the song was at number seventy-one on the Official Chart Update in the UK. On 4 November 2020 the song was heading for the official UK top twenty with over 11,000 downloads. On 6 November 2020, the song entered the UK Singles Chart at number thirty-two, the song also reached number one on the UK Singles Downloads Chart and Scottish Singles Chart.

Track listing

Personnel
Credits adapted from Tidal. 
 Daniel Whibley – Composer
 Paul Harvey – Composer
 BBC Philharmonic – Orchestra

Charts

Release history

References

2020 songs
2020 singles